Rafael Cavestany y de Anduaga (27 October 1902 – 17 July 1958) was a Spanish politician who served as Minister of Agriculture of Spain between 1951 and 1957, during the Francoist dictatorship.

References

1902 births
1958 deaths
Agriculture ministers of Spain
Government ministers during the Francoist dictatorship